Helgbustadøya (sometimes Helgebustad or Helgebostad) is an island in the municipality of Hitra in Trøndelag county, Norway.

The eastern third of the island has a pine forest that is a nature reserve and the western two-thirds is a rocky, barren plateau that has many ponds and marsh areas.

See also
List of islands of Norway

References

Islands of Trøndelag
Hitra